Sandusky Mall is an indoor shopping center located in Perkins Township, south of Sandusky, Ohio.  It is located on the east side of US 250 (Milan Road), north of I-80/I-90 (Ohio Turnpike) and SR 2. It is the only major shopping center within . The mall comprises more than 70 stores. The anchor stores are TJ Maxx, JCPenney, Books-A-Million, Dewey Furniture, Five Below, and Ross. There is currently a partially vacant anchor remaining: Elder Beerman, which was partially filled by Shoe Dept. Encore when they relocated from their former spot by American Eagle Outfitters. JCPenney had previously operated a store in downtown Sandusky. It is managed by Cafaro Company of Niles, Ohio.

The former Macy's location is currently being renovated for three new stores coming in as a part of the mall redevelopment. TJMaxx moved in to a portion of the former Macy's space as well as a Five Below. Ross will be opening in July 2022 in the anchor space near TJ Maxx. Dewey Furniture has been announced as a new anchor to Sandusky Mall. A new restaurant is also coming to the mall in 2021. Another Broken Egg Cafe will be opening at the mall's Food Court.

The mall has three entrances: one located in the main shopping concourse near the Food Court, one in the South concourse near American Eagle, and the other in the North concourse near JCPenney, there is also an entrance in Books-A-Million, three in JCPenney, and one in T.J. Maxx. 

The malls occupancy rate is 86%. This mall is doing fairly good compared to other malls in the U.S. according to Anthony Cafaro.

History
Mall construction began in 1976 and Sandusky Mall opened in 1977. Its original anchors included JCPenney, Cohn's (later Halle's  and then Elder-Beerman), The May Department Stores Company (simply the May Co.), Woolworth's (later TJ Maxx), and Montgomery Ward (later Sears in 1986). The outdoor section, Child World closed in 1992 and later converted to OfficeMax in 1994, then closed in 2005. It was converted to K&K Home Furnishings in 2006, then closed in 2014. It later converted to a Planet Fitness in 2015.

On November 7, 2003, a Best Buy store opened outside the mall.

The May Co. rebranded their store at the Sandusky Mall as Kaufmann's in the mid-1990s. In 2006, the store was converted to Macy's, when May Department Stores Company and Federated Department Stores merged into Macy's, Inc. Borders opened in 2005. TJ Maxx was added in 2009. Borders closed in 2011. A few months later, it was replaced by BAM!.

On April 7, 2016, Sears announced that its store would be closing in June 2016.

On January 4, 2017, Macy's announced that its store would also be closing as part of a plan to close 100 stores nationwide over the next several years. The store closed in March 2017.

In December 2017, Charming Charlie, located between the former Macy's and Sears, closed because of bankruptcy.

In March 2018, the Ruby Tuesday restaurant at the front of the mall shuttered its location.

On April 18, 2018, it was announced that Elder-Beerman would be closing all of their stores after the parent company, Bon-Ton, filed for bankruptcy. The store closed late August 2018.

Development plan
In December 2018, Cafaro Company announced that they had a redevelopment plan set in place for the mall with changes on the horizon coming within the next year.

On June 30, 2019, it was announced that Hobby Lobby, a crafts and home decor store, would be coming to the Sandusky Mall. It replaced roughly half of the former Sears store. It opened March 23, 2020.

The mall complex is being transformed into a mixed-used property to feature retail, residential, entertainment, and office space. Changes are currently underway.

Stores that relocated to other portions of the mall from the Sears wing included Spencer's, Nail World, and Ritaz Parlor to make way for the new mall redevelopment. In October 2020, Shoe Dept. Encore moved into a newly renovated space in Center Court from its old location adjacent to American Eagle.

It was announced on December 17, 2020, that T.J. Maxx will open in their new location, inside the mall, in 2021. They will be the closest to the mall entrance inside the former Macy's location. Five Below will also open near Hobby Lobby in 2021 in the former Macy's. A new restaurant will also be coming to the mall as part of the redevelopment. Another Broken Egg Cafe will be opening at the mall in 2021 near Cheers Sports Bar and Grill. More changes will be coming as well. The mall will also get another entrance in the south corridor near American Eagle. This will add to the additional entrances at the food court and near JCPenney. The remaining space left in the former Elder Beerman will be transformed into a mixed use area for business. The mall will then have no vacant anchor spaces.

On May 30, 2021, Five Below held its soft opening and opened to the public for its grand opening on June 4, 2021. Five Below is located in a portion of the former Macy’s, near Hobby Lobby. 

On October 21, 2021, T.J. Maxx opened its new store at Sandusky Mall, adding to the department store lineup at Sandusky Mall.

On October 30, 2022, Ross Dress for Less opened a new store at the Sandusky Mall

Stores
The mall features anchor tenants such as TJ Maxx, JCPenney, Books-A-Million, Dewey Furniture, Five Below, and Ross. The mall also offers American Eagle, Sephora, Bath and Body Works & White Barn, Victoria's Secret, Kay Jewelers, Journeys, Spencer's, Aeropostale, Lids, Express Factory, Zales Jewelers, Hot Topic, Finish Line, Shoe Department Encore, Champs, Rue 21, Nail World, Ritaz Parlor, Hollywood Nails, a hair salon in JCPenney, a phone repair store, a phone case store, Hallmark, Claire's, International Jewelry, Ming Spa, T-shirt Station, and more.

Food court
In 2017 the mall made major renovations to the Food Court. They added a restroom for the Food Court, an Asian Express, and a Lotus Garden, along with improving their additional food vendors such as, Auntie Anne's, Mrs. Fields, and Cheers Sports Bar & Grill. The malls Food Court offers Asian Express, Auntie Anne's, Lotus Garden, Mrs. Fields, Another Broken Egg, and Cheers Sports Bar & Grill. The Food Court is located in the west shopping concourse, or can be accessed through the main entrance outside. The mall also has a coffee shop located in Books-A-Million. Restaurants located on the mall property outside of the mall itself include: Cracker Barrel, Red Lobster, and Texas Roadhouse.

Mall layout
The mall has four corridors: West, North, East, & South. Stores featured in the North corridor include JCPenney, Books-A-Million, and Bath & Body Works. Stores in the East corridor include Spencer's, and Aeropostale. Stores in the South corridor include American Eagle, Five-Below, Dewey Furniture, and Journey's. Stores in the West corridor include TJ Maxx, Ross, and the Food Court. The center of the mall where all the corridors meet is referred to as Center Court. Center Court features stores such as Shoe Dept. Encore, Lids, and the children's play area.

Anchor stores
TJ Maxx, JCPenney, Books-A-Million, Dewey Furniture, Five Below, Ross

References

Shopping malls established in 1977
Shopping malls in Ohio
Cafaro Company
Buildings and structures in Erie County, Ohio
Tourist attractions in Erie County, Ohio